The Cumulus 28, also called the Albin Cumulus, is a Swedish sailboat that was designed by Peter Norlin as a cruiser-racer and first built in 1978.

Production
The design was built by Albin Marine in Sweden from 1978 to 1985, with 567 examples completed. The company also built boats in Taiwan. In 2008 the company was sold to Bladen Composites in the United States, but the company seems to now be out of business.

Design
The Cumulus 28 is a recreational keelboat, built predominantly of fiberglass, with teak wood trim. It has a 7/8 fractional sloop rig with aluminum spars, a deck-stepped mast, wire standing rigging and no spreaders. The hull has a raked stem, a reverse transom, a transom-hung rudder controlled by a tiller and a fixed fin keel. It displaces  and carries  of ballast.

The boat's galley is located on the port side of the cabin at the bottom of the companionway steps. On the port side is a stainless steel sink and a three-burner alcohol stove. The head has a privacy door and is located forward, just aft of the bow "V"-berth and has a hanging locker. Additional sleeping space is provided by the dinette settee, which has a folding table. There is also a quarter berth aft on the starboard side, for a total sleeping accommodation for five people.

Ventilation is provided by an acrylic forward hatch and two ventilators, while the cabin ports are fixed.

The boat has internally-mounted halyards and includes jiffy reefing. The cockpit has two self-tailing genoa winches, with the genoa blocks track-mounted. The spinnaker also uses its own tracks and car. There is a standard 4:1 boom vang and 4:1 mainsheet. There is an anchor well in the bow.

See also
List of sailing boat types

Similar sailboats
Alerion Express 28
Aloha 28
Beneteau First 285
Cal 28
Catalina 28
Grampian 28
Hunter 28
Hunter 28.5
Hunter 280
J/28
O'Day 28
Pearson 28
Sabre 28
Sea Sprite 27
Sirius 28
Tanzer 28
TES 28 Magnam
Viking 28

References

Keelboats
1980s sailboat type designs
Sailing yachts
Sailboat type designs by Peter Norlin
Sailboat types built by Albin Marine